The 66th Infantry Division was a unit of the United States Army during World War II. Activated 15 April 1943, the division trained at Camp Blanding, Florida, and was later transferred to Camp Robinson, Arkansas and then later to Camp Rucker, Alabama before being shipped overseas to England on 26 November 1944. Commanded by Maj. Gen. Herman F. Kramer, the 66th Infantry Division's main role in World War II was containing and eliminating the remaining pockets of German soldiers in Northern France.

Combat chronicle
Three regiments of the 66th Infantry Division arrived in Dorchester, England on 26 November 1944, and the rest of the Division joined them on 12 December 1944. They trained and prepared for deployment until 24 December 1944, then transferred to Southampton before crossing the English Channel to Cherbourg, France. Two transport vessels, SS Cheshire and the Belgian Leopoldville carried the 66th across the English Channel. However, only 5 miles from the port of Cherbourg, the Leopoldville was torpedoed by a German U-Boat and sunk, taking the lives of 14 officers and 748 enlisted soldiers. The U.S. Navy later announced the sinking of the Leopoldville to be the second-largest loss of life from the sinking of a troop transport ship in the entire European Theater.

Primarily involved with destroying the German troops left behind in port cities in western France such as Lorient, St. Nazaire, Royan and La Rochelle following the retreat during the summer of 1944, the 66th Infantry Division relieved the 94th Infantry Division of control of the Brittany-Loire area on 29 December 1944, and collaborated with French forces as well. The 66th carried out its objective by harassing German installations, conducting limited objective attacks, and running reconnaissance missions to gather intelligence. The use of artillery shelling many German positions also played a major part in the advancement of the 66th through the region. Notably, a heavy German attack near La Croix was repulsed on 16 April 1945 and several strongly fortified enemy positions were taken from 19 to 29 April 1945 in a series of counterattacks. The remaining German soldiers surrendered to 66th Infantry Division officers and French officials in a small cafe near Cordemais on 8 May 1945.

Ordered to change to an occupation-oriented mission on 14 May 1945, the 66th made a 700-mile trek into Germany where the Black Panthers occupied 2,400 square miles of territory and the city of Koblenz. As a security force, the division was charged with establishment of a military government and control of all German affairs. Tasks included the discharge of prisoners of war, inventorying of ammunition and supplies, and organizing civilians. After spending time in Germany, the 66th returned to the French coast to aid with the allied withdrawal from the European Theater. During this time, the composition of the division was changed by the beginning of the inactivation process, until it returned to the U.S. and was formally inactivated, sailing for home 27 October 1945.

Order of battle

The division consisted of these units:

 Headquarters, 66th Infantry Division
 262d Infantry Regiment
 263d Infantry Regiment
 264th Infantry Regiment
 Headquarters and Headquarters Battery, 66th Infantry Division Artillery
721st Field Artillery Battalion (155 mm)
870th Field Artillery Battalion (105 mm)
871st Field Artillery Battalion (105 mm)
872d Field Artillery Battalion (105 mm)
 266th Engineer Combat Battalion
 366th Medical Battalion
 66th Cavalry Reconnaissance Troop (Mechanized)
 Headquarters, Special Troops, 66th Infantry Division
 Headquarters Company, 66th Infantry Division
 766th Ordnance Light Maintenance Company
 66th Quartermaster Company
 566th Signal Company
 Military Police Platoon
 Band
 66th Counterintelligence Corps Detachment

The 422d and 423d Infantry Regiments (from the 106th Infantry Division) were attached to the division from 15 April to 15 May 1945.

Casualties
Total battle casualties: 1,452
Killed in action: 795 (Includes Leopoldville disaster)
Wounded in action: 636
Prisoner of war: 21

Assignments in European Theater of Operations
27 December 1944: 12th Army Group.
31 March 1945: Fifteenth Army, 12th Army Group.

Aesthetic
Nickname: Black Panther Division
Shoulder sleeve insignia: The snarling panther suggests the power, aggressiveness and endurance of the Division. The shoulder sleeve insignia was approved on 26 August 1943

The shoulder sleeve insignia was designed by Nicolas Viscardi (known professionally as Nick Cardy), a comic book artist who served in the Division during World War II. Viscardi won a competition to design the patch, and subsequently created the iconic logo. Viscardi also earned two Purple Hearts for wounds suffered as a tank driver while serving with the 3rd Armored Division.

References
The Lone Sentry: 66th: The Story of the 66th Infantry Division Stars and Stripes in Paris, 1944–1945, reproduced at Lone Sentry: 66th: The Story of the 66th Infantry Division -- WWII G.I. Stories Booklet
The Army Almanac: A Book of Facts Concerning the Army of the United States U.S. Government Printing Office, 1950 reproduced at history.army.mil.

External links
 66th: The Story of the 66th Infantry Division

066th Infantry Division, U.S.
Infantry Division, U.S. 066
Infantry divisions of the United States Army in World War II
Military units and formations established in 1943
Military units and formations disestablished in 1945